The president of the Senate of Eswatini is the presiding officer of the Senate of Eswatini.

The president is elected by the Senate, either among its own members (other than ministers) or from among persons who are not members.

Sources

Politics of Eswatini
Eswatini, Senate